Nicholas J. Pirro, Jr. (born May 29, 1940) is a New York politician most notable for having served as county executive of Onondaga County, New York.

Pirro was born on Syracuse's North Side to Nicholas, Sr. and Camille.  He attended Our Lady of Pompeii School and Christian Brothers Academy and graduated from Le Moyne College in 1964 with a degree in business management.  He entered politics at age 22, serving as campaign manager for a bowling alley operator who was running for the Onondaga County Board of Supervisors.  He served one term as supervisor and ten terms as county legislator.

He served as Chairman of the County Legislature starting in 1980.  After his predecessor announced his retirement in 1987, Pirro clinched the Republican nomination for County Executive and won the November election  He served a total of five terms in office.

The Onondaga County Convention Center is named in his honor.

References

1940 births
Living people
Onondaga County Executives
Le Moyne College alumni
New York (state) Republicans
Politicians from Syracuse, New York